Kingsdown is a hamlet in the civil parish of Box, Wiltshire, England.

At the top of Doctor's Hill, Kingsdown House is a three-storey ashlar house from the early 18th century; its formal front with parapet and corner urns was embellished in the 19th century with a Corinthian porch and a roof-height clock. There was a private asylum here from the 17th century to the mid-20th, latterly called Kingsdown Nursing Home. The house and its adjacent 19th-century buildings are now in residential use.

A Methodist chapel was built in 1869 and rebuilt in 1926. By 2003 it was a private house.

There is a pub, the Swan Inn. Kingsdown Golf Course is on higher ground to the east of the hamlet.

References

External links 

 
 The Swan Inn – Box People and Places, 2018

Box, Wiltshire
Hamlets in Wiltshire